Cypress Grove is a cheese manufacturer located in Arcata, California.  They specialize in goat cheeses including the award-winning Humboldt Fog.

History 
Cypress Grove was founded in 1983 in McKinleyville, California, by Mary Keehn.  In 2004, they moved operations to nearby Arcata as part of an expansion.

On August 22, 2010, Cypress Grove was acquired by Swiss company Emmi. Operations stayed in Arcata.

See also

 List of cheesemakers

References

Dairy products companies in California
Cheesemakers
Companies based in Humboldt County, California
1983 establishments in California